A3C may refer to:
 Air Copter A3C, a French autogyro
 Airman Third Class, a rank in the United States Air Force
 Australian Cyber Collaboration Centre, a government-funded organisation in Adelaide, South Australia